This list of mountains and hills of the Taunus contains a selection of the highest and most notable mountains and hills in the Taunus and its foothills in the German states of Hesse and Rhineland-Palatinate. The Taunus is part of the Rhenish Massif, part of the German Central Uplands, and has three nature parks: Taunus (formerly Hochtaunus), Nassau and Rhine-Taunus.

The mountains and hills in the table below are initially sorted by height in metres (m) above sea level (NHN) (source  unless otherwise stated) 
The table may be resorted by any of five columns by clicking on the symbol at the top. In the column headed "Mountain or hill" alternative names are given in brackets, small text and italics. In this column, when there is more than one entry of the same name, they are distinguished by a place name.

The abbreviations used in the table are explained below.

Abkürzungen 
Die in der Tabelle verwendeten Abkürzungen (alphabetisch sortiert) bedeuten:

County abbreviations:
 HG = Hochtaunuskreis
 LDK = Lahn-Dill-Kreis
 LM = Limburg-Weilburg
 RÜD = Rheingau-Taunus-Kreis
 MTK = Main-Taunus-Kreis
 EMS = Rhein-Lahn-Kreis
 FB = Wetteraukreis

Independent city and town abbreviations:
 GI = Gießen
 WI = Wiesbaden

German state abbreviations (ISO 3166-2):
 HE = Hesse
 RP = Rhineland-Palatinate

Sonstiges:
 > = "greater than" symbol (here: used where the actual height is probably higher than that given)
 AT = viewing tower
 FFH = Fauna-Flora habitat region
 KD = Cultural monument
 ND = Natural monument
 Nk = Subpeak
 NP = Nature park
 NSG = Nature reserve
 UG-R Limes = Upper Germanic-Rhaetian Limes (ORL)
 RMC = Römerkastell = Roman military camp
 VCP = Verband Christlicher Pfadfinderinnen und Pfadfinder
 s. a. = see also

See also
 List of mountains and hills of the Rhenish Massif
 List of mountains and hills of Hesse
 List of mountains and hills of Rhineland-Palatinate

References and footnotes 

Taunus
!Taunus
!Taunus